Apostolic Faith Mission is the name of several Pentecostal congregations and denominations, and may refer to:

Apostolic Faith Mission (Brooklyn), New York City
Apostolic Faith Mission of South Africa
Apostolic Faith Mission Church of God, Mobile, Alabama, U.S.
Former name of the Apostolic Faith Church, Eugene, Portland, U.S.

Historical
Apostolic Faith Mission of Los Angeles, California, home to the Azusa Street Revival; see Peniel Mission
Apostolic Faith Mission of Australasia, the first Pentecostal organization in Australia, succeeded by the Assemblies of God in Australia
Apostolic Faith Mission in China (使徒信心會), a loose organization of American Pentecostal missionaries; see Zhang Lingsheng

See also
Zion Apostolic Faith Mission Church, Zimbabwe